Present Italian car number plates have black characters on a rectangular white background, with small blue side-fields (see European vehicle registration plates). The current numbering scheme, in use from 1994, is unrelated to the geographical provenance of the car. By law, Italian plates can only be made by the Istituto Poligrafico e Zecca dello Stato and issued by local departments of motor vehicles.

History

1897-1901 
The very first Italian plates had to have the owner's name and the local communal number visible.

1901-1905 
These early Italian number plates gave the unabbreviated name of the place of origin, followed by a number, as GENOVA 83 and PADOVA 2. These were first plates to be made of metal and had to be manufactured by the car's owner. Today, only two plates of this time remain, GENOVA 83 and PADOVA 2, conserved in museums.

Schematic representation:

1905-1927 
Plates in this period were black-on-white. The registration number was a numeric code (in red), different for each province, and a progressive number on a single line, unique for that province (in black). E.g.  – 2993, where 63 is the code for Turin. Motorcycles had square plates.

A front plate was optional.

Schematic representation:

1927-1976 

In 1927, Mussolini changed the number plates from white background with black digits, to black background with white digits and introduced the two letter provincial code for all provinces (except for Rome  that was allowed to have the full name on the number plate) instead of the number system used until 1927.

From 1927 to 1932, the progressive code was found before the provincial code on a single line. Then, the progressive code was moved before the provincial code in front plates and after it in rear plates.
Although Rome had the full name displayed on the number plates, in documents for practical purposes it uses the unofficial code RM.

From 1932 to 1951, rear plates were squares 32.0 x 20.0 cm large and used a slightly altered Garamond font. Rear plates had the Fasces emblem next to the provincial from 1928 to 1944. After Mussolini's fall, from 1944 to 1948, the Association of War Maimed and Disabled printed the number plates and their symbol appeared instead of the Fasces. 
In 1948 the Constitution of the Italian Republic was approved, so the Republic emblem appeared on the number plate on both rear and front plates but the format and font were kept from the previous period.

From 1951 to 1976, rear plates size was reduced to a square 27.5 × 20 cm large, and front plates was 26.2 × 5.7 cm, the front plates' design was also changed to have more linear characters and the Republic emblem was made smaller.
Note that single line rear registration plates (similar to the ones used by other European countries) were not available until 1976. The registration number was the provincial code, which is a two-letter code (exception: Rome's code is Roma), and a progressive code, unique for that province, up to 6 characters long. Between the provincial code and the first two digits was the Italian Republic emblem (a garland surrounding a five-pointed star with the letters "RI" in the middle of the star).

The progressive code for the first 999999 cars of the provinces was just a progressive number, not filled with initial zeroes; in the rear plate the last four digits were in the second row and the first ones (when present) in the first row.
For cars from 1000000, it was A00000-A99999, B00000-B99999 etc. Possible letters were, in this order, A B D E F G H K L M N P R S T U V Z X Y W. After that, it was 00000A-99999A, 00000D-99999D etc. Possible letters were, in this order, A D E F G H L M N P R S T V W X Y Z; then, the letter was moved to the second position, and then to third (same range as in second position).

Schematic representation:

Front Plate

1927-1932 rear plate

1976-1985 

The front plate was kept intact as in the 1927-1976 period. The rear plate, instead, began to be manufactured in two pieces. 
One, sized 10,7 × 33 cm, had black background with white digits, contained the progressive number and, in a very small font, the repetition of provincial code above and the Republic emblem. 
The other had black background with orange letters and contained the official provincial code and had two variants.  One was 10,7 × 33 cm large, the other one was 10,7 × 20 cm large. Only one of the latter two was used depending on the type of plate holder that the plate was destined for: for a rectangular plate holder, the small provincial code piece was installed left of the progressive code, put together with rivets in specifically designed holes in the progressive code
For cars that were designed with the previous number plate holder (Square), or too small for a rectangular plate, the long provincial code piece was installed above the progressive code.
This change resolved the plate positioning problem on cars of foreign production, eventually the rectangular European system was preferred over the squared plate holder of Italian designed cars.

Schematic representations:

References

External links
 Plates in Rome provides detailed coverage of Italian number plates from 1903 onwards.
 License Plates of Italy Photos of Italy license plates and vehicles

Italy
Italy transport-related lists
Car number
 Registration plates